A spatial gradient is a gradient whose components are spatial derivatives, i.e., rate of change of a given scalar physical quantity with respect to the position coordinates. 
Homogeneous regions have spatial gradient vector norm equal to zero.
When evaluated over vertical position (altitude or depth), it is called vertical gradient; the remainder is called horizontal gradient, the vector projection of the of the full gradient onto the horizontal plane.

Examples:
Biology
 Concentration gradient, the ratio of solute concentration between two adjoining regions
 Potential gradient, the difference in electric charge between two adjoining regions
Fluid dynamics and earth science
  Density gradient
  Pressure gradient
  Temperature gradient
 Geothermal gradient
 Sound speed gradient
  Wind gradient
 Lapse rate

See also
Grade (slope)
Time derivative
Material derivative
Structure tensor
Surface gradient